Samarium(III) acetate is an acetate salt of samarium, with the chemical formula of Sm(CH3COO)3. It exists in the hydrate and tetrahydrate form. Its tetrahydrate can be obtained by dissolving samarium(III) oxide in 50% acetic acid solution, crystallizing and vacuum drying. The mixed anion acetate [Sm(CH3COO)(H2O)6]Cl2·H2O and [Sm(CH3COO)2(H2O)3]Cl can be crystallized from SmCl3·6H2O and SmOCl in acetic acid solution respectively.

References 

Samarium compounds
Acetates